Bindhya Ram , known by her stage name Rachita Ram, is an Indian actress who is primarily known for her work in Kannada films. Rachita made her film debut with the 2013 film Bulbul as the lead opposite Darshan S.

Early life 
She is a trained classical Bharata Natyam dancer who has given more than 50 performances. Her father Ram, also a Bharata Natyam dancer, has given nearly 500 public performances. She has a sister, Nithya Ram, who is also a television and film actress.

She studied High school at Niveditha Girls High School, Gavipuram, Bengaluru.

Career 
In 2012, she auditioned for a lead role in Bulbul alongside 200 participants and was selected. Before that she worked in the Kannada television soap Benkiyalli Aralida Hoovu along with her sister Nithya Ram. She was paired opposite Darshan in the film that went on to become a success commercially. On her performance, G. S. Kumar of The Times of India wrote, "Rachita Ram has presented an excellent performance in her first movie" and added, "Rachita Ram is amazing with her dialogue delivery, body language and excellent expressions." Her first release of 2014 was Dil Rangeela, in which she was paired opposite Ganesh. B. S. Srivani of Deccan Herald felt that she "delivers a seasoned performance" in the film. Her second release of the year saw her paired opposite Darshan again in Ambareesha. The film and her performance earned negative reviews from critics. In Ranna, she played Rukmini, the love interest of Sudeep, appearing in a small yet pivotal role. In Rathavara, she appeared as the love interest of Sriimurali, who plays a gangster and key aide of an MLA. Sunayana Suresh of The Times of India wrote, "Rachita Ram looks pretty and has acted every bit the cutesy girl-next-door that is required of her".

Rachita starred in the 2016 Kannada movie Chakravyuha opposite Puneeth Rajkumar. She made a cameo appearance in Jaggu Dada Starring Darshan. She also appeared in a song opposite Sudeep In Mukunda Murari.

Rachita's first release of 2017 was Pushpaka Vimana opposite Ramesh Aravind, where she played his daughter. Her next release was Chethan Kumar's Bharjari opposite Dhruva Sarja; it is also her second movie with actress Haripriya, after Ranna.

In 2018 her first release was Preetham Gubbi's Johnny Johnny Yes Papa opposite Duniya Vijay. Her next release was Mahesh Kumar's Ayogya opposite Sathish Ninasam. It emerged as the biggest blockbuster of the year and she also won Best Actress-2018 at SIIMA awards. She also appeared in a song opposite Shiva Rajkumar in the movie The Villain.

In 2019 she had a handful of releases. Her first release was Seetharama Kalyana, opposite Nikhil Kumar, which emerged as a blockbuster hit. Her next release was Puneeth Rajkumar's Natasaarvabhowma directed by Pavan Wadeyar, her second collaboration with Puneeth after Chakravyuva. She appeared in a song in the movie Amar starring Abhishek Gowda. Her next release was R. Chandru's I Love You opposite star Upendra. She also made an appearance in Shivrajkumar's Rustum directed by Ravi Varma, where she was paired up with Bollywood actor Vivek Oberoi. She made a special appearance in a song in Bharaate opposite Sriimurali. This was followed by Ayushman Bhava where she played opposite Shiva Rajkumar.

After a gap of a year, In 2021 her first release was with Ramesh Aravind directoral 100 where she played Ramesh's sister character. The movie became an average grosser at the box office. Her next release in the year was Shankar's Love You Rachchu where she was paired opposite Ajay Rao, the movie with many controversies failed at the box office with poor response from the audience. In 2022 she made her Telugu debut opposite Kalyan Dev in the film Super Machi which was not ony a disaster at the box office and also the least collected film of the actress career as the film had zero collection at the box office.

Filmography
All films are in Kannada, unless otherwise noted.

Music videos

Television

Awards and nominations
For Bulbul, 61st Filmfare Awards South for the Best Actress
For Ranna, 63rd Filmfare Awards South for the Critic's Best Actress 
For Ranna, 5th SIIMA Awards for the Best Actress
For Rathavara, 2nd IIFA Utsavam for the Best Actress 
For Ayogya, 8th SIIMA Awards for the Best Actress
Zee Kannada Hemmeya Kannadiga Awards in 2019 for the Best Actress
For Ayushman Bhava, 9th SIIMA Awards for the Best Actress

See also
 List of Indian film actresses
Nithya Ram

References

External links

 

Living people
Indian film actresses
Actresses in Kannada cinema
Kannada actresses
21st-century Indian actresses
Actresses from Bangalore
Actresses from Bhopal
Year of birth missing (living people)